Events from the year 1300 in Ireland.

Incumbent
Lord: Edward I

Events

Births
 Petronilla de Meath (died 1324)

Deaths

References 

 
1300s in Ireland
Ireland